Wabedo is an unincorporated community in Wabedo Township, Cass County, Minnesota, United States, near Longville. It is along Cass County Road 54 near the junction with County Road 120.

References

Unincorporated communities in Cass County, Minnesota
Unincorporated communities in Minnesota